Oberea pruinosa is a species of beetle in the family Cerambycidae. It was described by Thomas Lincoln Casey, Jr. in 1913. It is native to North America.

References

Beetles described in 1913
pruinosa
Taxa named by Thomas Lincoln Casey Jr.